"Spin the Wheel" is a single by the Irish girl group Bellefire. It is the title track from their second album.

Track listing - CD1
"Spin the Wheel"
"Not Letting Go" (Non-album track)

Track listing - CD2
"Spin the Wheel"
"Spin the Wheel" (Groovefinder edit)
"All I Want Is You" (Live acoustic)

CD2 also includes the video for "Spin the Wheel", plus a 'Behind the Scenes' documentary about the making of the video.

Charts

References

2004 singles
Bellefire songs
2004 songs
East West Records singles